Juan del Río Martín (14 October 1947 – 28 January 2021) was a Spanish archbishop, Military Ordinary of Spain from 2008 until his death in 2021.

Career
In 1964 he obtained the Baccalaureate in his hometown. He entered the Seminary of Seville in 1965, where he would study Philosophy and Theology until 1973. In 1975 he obtained the title of social graduate from the University of Granada. Sent to Rome in 1979, he received a degree in Dogmatic Theology from the Pontifical Gregorian University, subsequently obtaining a Ph.D. degree in the same specialty with a thesis on the ecclesiology of Saint John of Avila.

Ordained priest on 2 February 1974 in Seville, he developed his entire pastoral ministry in the Archdiocese of Seville. On 29 June 2000, he was appointed second bishop of the Diocese of Asidonia-Jerez by John Paul II. His consecration was carried out by the Apostolic Nuncio in Spain Manuel Monteiro de Castro on 23 September of that year. Benedict XVI appointed him Military Ordinary of Spain on 30 June 2008.

Death
On 21 January 2021, he was admitted to the Gómez Ulla Military Hospital in Madrid after contracting COVID-19 during the COVID-19 pandemic in Spain. Although during the first days it was reported that he was recovering, soon his condition worsened and he succumbed to the disease on 27 January.

Notes

1947 births
2021 deaths
21st-century Roman Catholic archbishops in Spain
People from the Province of Huelva
University of Granada alumni
Bishops appointed by Pope John Paul II
Deaths from the COVID-19 pandemic in Spain